Peter Fraser is a Scottish actor best known for playing freedom fighter David Campbell in the 1964 Doctor Who serial The Dalek Invasion of Earth. Campbell was a significant character, as his love for the Doctor's granddaughter Susan caused her to be the first of the Doctor's companions to leave him. Fraser also appeared in the notable films The Sorcerers and The French Lieutenant's Woman, amongst others.

References

External links
 

20th-century Scottish male actors
Scottish male film actors
Scottish male television actors
Living people
Year of birth missing (living people)